Till the Day I Die is a play by Clifford Odets performed on Broadway in 1935.

Description
The play is a seven-scene drama written by Clifford Odets. It was originally written as a piece to accompany Waiting for Lefty.

Productions

It was produced by the Group Theatre and staged by Cheryl Crawford, and ran for 136 performances from March 26, 1935, to July 1935 at the Longacre Theatre.

When the New Theatre in Sydney, tried to stage it in 1936, following its production of Waiting for Lefty earlier that year, the German Consul General in Australia complained to the Commonwealth Government and the play was banned. However the theatre defied the ban and staged the play in private premises, and (after a similar controversy), it was staged to large audiences in Melbourne's New Theatre.

Terminology
The play contains the first documented use of the phrase "male chauvinism".

Broadway cast

 Margaret Barker as Tillie	
 Abner Biberman as fourth Orderly	
 Roman Bohnen as Major Duhring	
 Lee J. Cobb as Detective Popper
 William Challee as Edsel Peltz
 Russell Collins as Schlupp 
 Walter Coy as	Karl Taussig	
 George Heller as Secretary	
 Elia Kazan as Baum and as other prisoner	
 Alexander Kirkland as Ernst Taussig	
 David Kortchmar as Zeltner and as second detective	
 Gerrit Kraber as third orderly and as first detective	
 Lewis Leverett as Captain Schlegel	
 Bob Lewis as Martin and as an orderly	
 Lee Martin as	Stieglitz	
 Paula Miller as woman	
 Paul Morrison as other prisoner	
 Ruth Nelson as woman	
 Dorothy Patten as Frau Duhring	
 Wendell K. Phillips as boy	
 Herbert Ratner as Adolph	
 Samuel Roland as first orderly and as Arno	
 Eunice Stoddard as Zelda	
 Harry Stone as another orderly and as second orderly	
 Bernard Zanville as Julius

References

External links
 
  

Broadway plays
Plays by Clifford Odets
1935 plays